The 2007 Rugby Canada Super League season was the tenth season for the RCSL.

Standings
Western Conference
{| class="wikitable" style="text-align: center;"
|-
! width="250"|Team
! width="20"|Pld
! width="20"|W
! width="20"|D
! width="20"|L
! width="20"|F
! width="20"|A
! width="25"|+/-
! width="20"|BP
! width="20"|Pts
|-
|align=left| Saskatchewan Prairie Fire
|4||4||0||0||127||65||+62||3||19
|-
|align=left| Edmonton Gold
|4||3||0||1||87||62||+25||3||15
|-
|align=left| Calgary Mavericks
|4||2||0||2||91||99||-8||2||10
|-
|align=left| Vancouver Island Crimson Tide
|4||1||0||3||78||66||+12||2||6
|-
|align=left| BC Wave
|4||0||0||4||54||145||-91||1||1
|}

Eastern Conference
{| class="wikitable" style="text-align: center;"
|-
! width="250"|Team
! width="20"|Pld
! width="20"|W
! width="20"|D
! width="20"|L
! width="20"|F
! width="20"|A
! width="25"|+/-
! width="20"|BP
! width="20"|Pts
|-
|align=left| Niagara Thunder
|6||6||0||0||219||58||+161||4||28
|-
|align=left| Newfoundland Rock
|6||5||0||1||276||72||+204||5||25
|-
|align=left| Ottawa Harlequins
|6||3||0||3||172||146||+26||4||16
|-
|align=left| Toronto Xtreme
|6||3||0||3||100||219||-119||2||14
|-
|align=left| New Brunswick Black Spruce
|6||1||1||4||113||168||-55||3||9
|-
|align=left| Quebec Caribou
|6||1||1||4||95||201||-106||1||7
|-
|align=left| Nova Scotia Keltics
|6||1||0||5||73||184||-111||1||5
|}

Note: 4 points for a win, 2 points for a draw, 1 bonus point for a loss by 7 points or less, 1 bonus point for scoring 4 tries or more.

Championship final

The championship game took place August 18, 2007 between the Niagara Thunder and the Saskatchewan Prairie Fire in Regina, at the Regina Rugby Park.  The game was won by Saskatchewan Prairie Fire by a score of 28–12.

References

Rugby Canada Super League seasons
RCSL Season
2007 in Canadian rugby union